A crowd scene is the representation of a crowd in art, literature or other media.

There are many examples of crowd scenes in American literature.  One classic is Poe's short story, "The Man of the Crowd", in which a mysterious old man is followed through London in the 19th century, when it was the most populous city in the world.

See also
 crowd simulation
 walla

References

Citations

Sources

 Film and video terminology
 Literary theory